The Pauserna are an indigenous people in Bolivia and Brazil who live along the upper Río Guaporé. Most of them live in the southeastern part of the department of Beni, in Bolivia. The people derive their name from the fact that the pao cerne tree is abundant in their area. Only a few of the older people speak the Pauserna language, which is closely related to Guaraní and is a member of the Tupí language family.

History 
Most likely the Pauserna migrated to Bolivia from Paraguay centuries before when the Guaraní attacked the frontiers of the Incan empire. The Pauserna's ancestors are believed to be the Guaraní. Guarayos and Pauserna once made up a single group; one part of that group, the ancestors of the Guarayu, was moved into missions, and the other part remained independent and is known as the Pauserna. Their first significant contact with outside people came in the 1880s, when rubber tappers came to the area. When Erland Nordenskiöld visited them during his expedition in 1914 they were small in numbers as a result of diseases. He visited them on the Brazilian side of Rio Guaporé in a village called Orikoripe. Here lived eight families and except for these there were about 15 more families in the whole Pauserna area at the time. Most of those families lived on the Bolivian side. Their population went into a period of sustained decline in the twentieth century. From approximately 130 people in the 1930 the Pauserna declined to 60 people in 1965 to fewer than 30 in the 1970s. The Bolivian population was censused at 125 in 2012.

Name 
Pauserna are also known as Araibayba, Carabere, Guarasug'we, Guarayuta, Itatin, Moterequoa, Pau Cerna and Pauserna-Guarasug'we.

Subsistance 
Originally foragers, the Pauserna have since become horticulturists. They raised a great variety of food and other plants available before contact but now have ceased raising manioc and have adopted the cultivation of rice and caripo (yams). Groups clear and prepare fields for planting. Men plant maize, and women plant manioc and assist in the harvest. Some also collect rubber and ipecac, which is used to make pharmaceuticals. Nordenskiöld writes that the Pauserna enjoyed the meat of alligators.

Dwellings 
The Pauserna once lived in multifamily dwellings but now live in single-family open sheds. Inside the house are food-storage platforms and cotton hammocks. For sitting, men have benches; women have mats.

Craft and clothes 
The Pauserna make and wear bark cloth and woven cotton garments. Women spin cotton thread using a drop spindle and a vertical loom. Pots are made with clay tempered with crushed potsherds.

Society and culture 
Boys were often scarified and bled to make them strong. Girls were secluded for a month at puberty, fed a restricted diet, and tattooed on their arms and breasts. Cross-cousin marriages and those between a man and his sister's daughter were preferred. A girl or woman could not marry without the consent of her father and brother. Polygyny was common. Postmarital residence was matrilocal at first, and then neolocal. Pregnant women had to observe certain food taboos. Fathers observed couvade by remaining in hammocks for three days following the birth of their children—it was believed that a child's soul follows the child's father and might be injured if it exerted itself immediately after birth. The dead were formerly buried in graves, over which a hut was built; today they are buried in their huts, wearing their paint and ornaments, wrapped up in mats, and facing west.

Language

References 

Ethnic groups in Brazil
Ethnic groups in Bolivia
Indigenous peoples in Brazil
Indigenous peoples in Bolivia
Indigenous peoples of the Amazon